Jesse James Kewley-Graham (born 15 June 1993) is an English footballer who plays for Combined Counties Premier Division club Walton & Hersham as a midfielder.

He has also played for Wycombe Wanderers, Staines Town, Havant & Waterlooville, Hampton & Richmond Borough and Hanwell Town.

Club career

Wycombe Wanderers 
Kewley-Graham progressed through the youth ranks at Brentford and Wycombe Wanderers before signing a professional contract in 2011.

On 21 January 2012, he made his professional debut as an injury time substitute in a 3–0 League One win against Rochdale.

He signed a one-year extension in June 2013, and was released upon the expiration of his contract.

Staines Town (loan) 
In October 2011, Kewley-Graham joined Conference South club Staines Town on loan and made his debut in a goalless FA Cup Second Qualifying Round encounter with Beaconsfield SYCOB. His deal was later extended for a second month.

Havant & Waterlooville (loan) 
In January 2013, Kewley-Graham joined Conference South side Havant & Waterlooville on a five-week loan. He returned to the club on a six-month loan in July 2013.

Hampton & Richmond Borough 
Upon his release, Kewley-Graham joined Isthmian League Premier Division club Hampton & Richmond Borough.

On 9 September 2014, he scored his first senior goal in a 6–4 defeat to Leiston. He scored again in the following game in a 2–2 draw at Hendon.

After struggling to break into the team and rejecting the opportunity to go out on loan, chairman Steve McPherson paid up Kewley-Graham's contract in order to release him from the club in January 2015.

Hanwell Town 
In August 2016, Kewley-Graham joined Southern League Division One Central side Hanwell Town. On 14 November 2017, he was sent off in a 5–3 League Cup defeat to Egham Town.

Walton & Hersham 
In January 2018, Kewley-Graham joined Combined Counties Premier Division side Walton & Hersham. He made his debut in a 3–1 defeat to CB Hounslow United on 27 January.

Statistics

References

External links

Official Profile at the official Wycombe Wanderers site

1993 births
Living people
Association football midfielders
Footballers from Hounslow
Wycombe Wanderers F.C. players
Staines Town F.C. players
Havant & Waterlooville F.C. players
Hampton & Richmond Borough F.C. players
Hanwell Town F.C. players
Walton & Hersham F.C. players
English Football League players
English footballers